Kimmo Tauriainen (born 16 March 1972) is a Finnish former footballer.

Career
He has played for RoPS, KePS, Kontu, FC Jokerit, MyPa and Atlantis FC. He also played one season in Norwegian IK Start. He won the Finnish Cup with Atlantis FC in 2001 and with MyPa in 2004. Tauriainen has also won Finnish championship in 2005 with MyPa.

Tauriainen returned to Atlantis from MyPa in 2006. He had to end his professional career because of knee injury after season 2006.

Personal life
He is the brother of fellow professional footballers Pasi Tauriainen and Vesa Tauriainen, and the uncle of Jimi Tauriainen and Julius Tauriainen.

Nowadays Kimmo works as a sales person in Duosport. Kimmo is also getting married during summer 2009 with singer Maria.

References

External links
http://www.atlantisfc.fi/fudis/akatemia/08a.htm

1972 births
Living people
People from Rovaniemi
Sportspeople from Lapland (Finland)
Finnish footballers
Finland youth international footballers
Association football midfielders
Veikkausliiga players
Eliteserien players
Ykkönen players
Rovaniemen Palloseura players
FC Kontu players
Kemi City F.C. players
GBK Kokkola players
Atlantis FC players
IK Start players
FC Jokerit players
Myllykosken Pallo −47 players
Finnish expatriate footballers
Finnish expatriate sportspeople in Norway
Expatriate footballers in Norway